|}

The Devoy Stakes is a Listed flat horse race in Ireland open to thoroughbreds aged four years and older. It is run at Naas over a distance of 1 mile and 2 furlongs (2,012 metres), and it is scheduled to take place each year in March.

The race was created as a new Listed race in 2019.

Winners

See also 
 Horse racing in Ireland
 List of Irish flat horse races

References 

Racing Post:

Flat races in Ireland
Open middle distance horse races
Naas Racecourse